The 1929 Ottawa Senators finished in 4th place in the Interprovincial Rugby Football Union with a 0–6 record and failed to qualify for the playoffs.

Regular season

Standings

Schedule

References

Ottawa Rough Riders seasons